Bixley Division, Suffolk is an electoral division of Suffolk which returns one county councillor to Suffolk County Council. It is located in the North East Area of Ipswich and equates to Bixley Ward of Ipswich Borough Council.

References

Electoral Divisions of Suffolk